Miroslava Kopicová (born 3 October 1951) is a Czech politician. She was the Minister of Education in the Mirek Topolánek's First Cabinet and in the caretaker government of Jan Fischer.

References

1951 births
Education ministers of the Czech Republic
Living people
Charles University alumni
Women government ministers of the Czech Republic
Civic Democratic Party (Czech Republic) Government ministers
People from Kadaň
21st-century Czech women politicians